Seo Byeong-ran (서병란, born 26 February 1922) was a South Korean boxer. He competed at the 1948 Summer Olympics and the 1952 Summer Olympics.

References

External links
  

1922 births
Possibly living people
South Korean male boxers
Olympic boxers of South Korea
Boxers at the 1948 Summer Olympics
Boxers at the 1952 Summer Olympics
Place of birth missing
Featherweight boxers